WarMech is a video game soundtrack album by Vancouver-based electro-industrial band Front Line Assembly. The album was released through Artoffact Records on June 22, 2018 as the soundtrack to Carbon Games' AirMech Wastelands, a sequel to the 2012 video game AirMech that also featured a soundtrack by Front Line Assembly. WarMech features Jeremy Inkel's final recordings, as he died on January 13, 2018.

The songs "Mechvirus" and "Molotov" were released for early streaming through the group's Bandcamp account.

Track listing

Personnel
Credits adapted from WarMech liner notes.

Front Line Assembly
 Bill Leeb – vocals, electronic instruments, production
 Jared Slingerland – electronic instruments, production
 Jeremy Inkel – strings recording, electronic instruments, production
 Sasha Keevil – electronic instruments, production
 Craig Johnson – electronic instruments, production

Additional musicians
 Jason Bazinet – additional samples

Technical personnel
 Dave McKean – album art

Chart history

References

External links
 WarMech on the Steam platform
 AirMech Wastelands on the Steam platform
 AirMech site at Carbon Games

2018 soundtrack albums
Front Line Assembly albums